James Loren Lohr (September 22, 1934 – June 24, 2017) was an American football player and coach. He was selected by the Baltimore Colts in the 1956 NFL Draft, but he was unable to participate due to an injury sustained during training camp. Lohr served as the head football coach at Southeast Missouri State University from 1974 to 1983, compiling a record of 52–53–4.

Head coaching record

Football

References

External links
 

1934 births
2017 deaths
American football tackles
Baltimore Colts players
Missouri State Bears football players
Southeast Missouri State Redhawks football coaches
High school football coaches in Missouri
People from McDonough County, Illinois
Coaches of American football from Illinois
Players of American football from Illinois